San Naing (born March 5, 1991) is a Burmese long-distance runner. He competed at the 2016 Summer Olympics in the men's 5000 metres race; his time of 15:51.05 in the heats did not qualify him for the final.

References

External links
 

1991 births
Living people
Burmese male long-distance runners
Olympic athletes of Myanmar
Athletes (track and field) at the 2016 Summer Olympics
Southeast Asian Games medalists in athletics
Southeast Asian Games bronze medalists for Myanmar
Competitors at the 2015 Southeast Asian Games